Giuseppe Bruno (1828–1893) was an Italian mathematician, professor of geometry in the university of Turin.

Life and work 
Bruno has born in a very poor family, but he won a stipend to study in the University of Turin, where he graduated in philosophy in 1846. The following years he was professor at secondary level, while he studied to graduate in engineering (1850) and to doctorate in mathematics (1851).

In 1852 he was appointed substitute professor of mathematics in the university of Turin; he combined this work with his private and public teaching in lower levels. In 1862 he was appointed professor of geometry in the university; in 1881 he became president of the Sciences Faculty.

Bruno wrote twenty one-papers, all but two in geometry, but he is mostly known by his teaching. Among his students are Giuseppe Peano and Corrado Segre.

References

Bibliography

External links 
 

19th-century Italian mathematicians
1828 births
1893 deaths